Spaak is a family originating from Bohuslän, Sweden, with notable branches in Belgium, France, and Italy.

Elias Jonæ Spaak (1650–1728), enrolled at Lund University in 1683 and subsequently postmaster and deputy customs chief inspector of Uddevalla, Bohuslän, assumed the family name in accordance with that of his residence. Among his issue were Protestant reformer Peter Spaak (1696–1769), and Magnus Spaak (1699–1768), who emigrated to Brussels, Belgium. Among Magnus Spaak's issue was Jacques Joseph Spaak (1742–1825), painter.

Members in selection

Sweden
 Peter Spaak (1696–1769), Protestant Reformer
 George Spaak (1877–1966), engineer
 Ragnar Spaak (1907–1979), physician

Belgium/France
 Jacques Joseph Spaak (1742–1825), Belgian painter
 Louis Spaak (1804–1893), Belgian architect
 Bob Spaak (1917–2011), Belgian sports journalist
 Paul Spaak (1871–1936), Belgian lawyer and playwright
 Marie Spaak (born Janson, 1873–1960), Belgian politician
 Paul-Henri Spaak (1899–1972), Belgian politician, statesman, and one of the founding fathers of the European Union
 Fernand Spaak (1923–1981), Belgian lawyer and diplomat
 Isabelle Spaak (born 1960), Belgian writer
 Antoinette Spaak (1928-2020), Belgian politician
 Charles Spaak (1903–1975), Belgian screenwriter
 Agnès Spaak (born 1944), actress and photographer
 Catherine Spaak (1945–2022), French-Italian actress and singer
 Suzanne Spaak (1905–1944), World War II French resistance operative

See also
 Spaak government
 Paul-Henri Spaak Foundation
 Paul-Henri-Spaak-Straße in Munich, Germany
 Haute École Paul-Henri Spaak
 Paul-Henri Spaak building
 Spaak method

References

Political families
Swedish families
Belgian families
Families of Swedish ancestry